Cristian Roldan (born June 3, 1995) is an American professional soccer player who plays as a midfielder for Major League Soccer club Seattle Sounders FC and the United States national team. He was the 2013 Gatorade National Player of the Year while playing for El Rancho High School in Pico Rivera, California, and played collegiate soccer for the Washington Huskies. Roldan was picked by the Sounders in the 2015 MLS SuperDraft and developed into a regular starting player for the club with over 250 total appearances .

Career

College and amateur

Roldan was named the 2013 Gatorade National Player of the Year in soccer while attending El Rancho High School in Pico Rivera, California. He declined invitations from the LA Galaxy and Chivas USA to join their academy teams and led the El Rancho Dons to an undefeated season with 26 wins. In his junior year, he had 21 goals and 21 assists for El Rancho and also played for youth club Union Independiente. During the 2012–13 season, he scored 54 goals and 30 assists and led El Rancho to a regional high school championship.

Roldan was scouted by the University of Washington at a tournament in San Diego and spent his college career with the Washington Huskies. In his two seasons of college soccer, Roldan made a total of 41 appearances and tallied 10 goals and seven assists as he helped lead the team to a Pac-12 title in 2013. Roldan was named the 2013 Pac-12 Freshman of the Year, beating future Sounders teammate Jordan Morris from the Stanford Cardinal.

During the college offseason, Roldan played in the Premier Development League for the Washington Crossfire. He joined the team in 2013 as part of preparations to join the Huskies. Roldan also played for the Portland Timbers U23s in the 2014 MLS Homegrown Game.

Professional

On January 8, 2015, it was announced that Roldan had left college early to sign a Generation Adidas contract with Major League Soccer. He was expected to be selected early in the 2015 MLS SuperDraft, but was chosen late in the first round with the 16th overall pick by Seattle Sounders FC. The Sounders traded with Real Salt Lake for the draft pick and had scouted Roldan during his offseason training sessions with the team. After making two substitute appearances the first two weeks of the season against the New England Revolution and the San Jose Earthquakes, Roldan made a substitute appearance for USL affiliate club Seattle Sounders FC 2 on March 21 and scored an 89th-minute goal in a 4–2 victory over defending USL champion Sacramento Republic FC. Due to injuries and international call-ups, he made his first MLS start the following week in a goalless draw away to FC Dallas.

Roldan developed into a deep-lying midfielder and earned a regular place in the starting lineup under head coach Sigi Schmid following his performances as an "impact substitute". He was compared to captain and defensive midfielder Osvaldo Alonso, who Roldan regarded as a mentor and ultimately replaced. Roldan scored his first career Major League Soccer goal on July 13, 2016, during a 5–0 win over FC Dallas. He formed a partnership and personal friendship with fellow rookie Jordan Morris—previously a collegiate rival—that was dubbed "Jorstian Mordan".

On November 10, 2019, Roldan featured for Seattle in a 3–1 home win over Toronto FC in MLS Cup 2019; he was involved in the build-up to his team's opening goal, after colliding with Jonathan Osorio, who lost the ball, while Seattle went on to score with Kelvin Leerdam. He also played all eight matches in Seattle's run to the 2022 CONCACAF Champions League title, providing one goal and five assists, and was named to the Team of the Tournament. Roldan underwent groin surgery in August 2022 to treat a sports hernia, his first major injury during his professional career. He returned to the team for their final three matches of the regular season as the Sounders failed to qualify for the playoffs.

International

Roldan represented the United States at under-20 level. He was also eligible to represent either Guatemala or El Salvador through his parents, and mentioned in an interview that he had been offered senior callups from both nations. On July 12, 2017, he was cap-tied to the United States national team by starting their 2017 CONCACAF Gold Cup group stage match against Martinique.

Roldan and Sounders teammate Jordan Morris were called up to the final roster for the 2022 FIFA World Cup. Roldan had played limited minutes during the preceding World Cup qualifying campaign, but was chosen by Gregg Berhalter for his leadership in training and ability to play in several roles.

Personal life

Roldan was featured in an Adidas commercial as a nine-year-old, selected for his soccer ball juggling skills from 110 kids who tried out for the commercial. Roldan is of Salvadoran and Guatemalan descent, and has an older brother named Cesar Jr., who works as a trainer for the LA Galaxy, and a younger brother Alex who has also played for the Sounders since 2019.

Career statistics

Club

International

Honors
Seattle Sounders FC
MLS Cup: 2016, 2019
CONCACAF Champions League: 2022

United States
CONCACAF Gold Cup: 2017, 2021

Individual
MLS All-Star: 2021
CONCACAF Champions League Best XI: 2022

References

External links

Sounders FC player profile
Washington Huskies biography
Adidas commercial featuring 10-year-old Roldan

1995 births
Living people
People from Pico Rivera, California
Sportspeople from Los Angeles County, California
American people of Guatemalan descent
American sportspeople of North American descent
Sportspeople of Guatemalan descent
Soccer players from California
American soccer players
American sportspeople of Salvadoran descent
Association football midfielders
Washington Huskies men's soccer players
USL League Two players
Washington Crossfire players
Major League Soccer players
Seattle Sounders FC draft picks
Seattle Sounders FC players
USL Championship players
Tacoma Defiance players
United States men's under-20 international soccer players
United States men's international soccer players
CONCACAF Gold Cup-winning players
2017 CONCACAF Gold Cup players
2019 CONCACAF Gold Cup players
2021 CONCACAF Gold Cup players
2022 FIFA World Cup players